Dalğalı may refer to:
 Dalğalı, Khachmaz, Azerbaijan
 Dalğalı, Neftchala, Azerbaijan